Beorhthun (floruit 680s) was a dux of the South Saxons.

Bede's Historia ecclesiastica gentis Anglorum (Book IV, Chapter 15) records the invasion of the South Saxon kingdom by Caedwalla of the West Saxons and the killing of the South Saxon king Æthelwalh. Caedwalla was driven off by Beorhthun and Andhun, who then jointly ruled the South Saxons. However, Bede reports, Beorhthun was later killed and the South Saxons conquered by Caedwalla.

External links 

 

Anglo-Saxon warriors
South Saxon monarchs
680s deaths
7th-century rulers in Europe
7th-century English people
Year of birth unknown